The Mailman is a 2004 American thriller film directed by Tony Mark and written by Brian Mazo.

Plot 

In 1986, young Darius Foxx witnessed his mailman father shoot his wife and her secret lover, then himself. Eighteen years later, Darius becomes the new mailman of Smithfield, cryptically informing the townspeople that his predecessor is "out of town" for an indeterminate amount of time.

Behind his initially cheerful facade, Darius is a psychopath who tampers with the mail of the people on his route, rewriting letters and smashing packages, among other acts of vandalism. Aiding Darius is Daniel Everson, a teenage delinquent who had become disillusioned after discovering that his older sister, Beth, and his best friend, Jay, are dating, and after being informed by Darius that he is adopted. Unbeknownst to Daniel however, Darius is a serial killer who has begun murdering those who become suspicious of him, such as a gas meter man, and Daniel's girlfriend, Veronica.

After the two enact a plan to blackmail the corrupt mayor using information on his sons' illegal activities that they have gleaned from the mail, Darius reveals to Daniel that he is his biological brother, and that he had moved to Smithfield to find and reconnect with him. Darius later sends Daniel out to get beer, and while he is gone, Darius kills a hitman sent by the mayor. While Darius disposes of the hitman's body, Beth and Jay break in, having become concerned about the new mailman's activities, and his relationship with Daniel. After the two find the body of the original mailman (the actual owner of Darius's house) stuffed in a closet, Darius appears, knocks them out, and ties them up, intent on raping Beth in front of Jay. As Darius strips Beth, Daniel returns, and is ordered to kill Beth by Darius. Instead of obeying Darius, Daniel stabs him with a letter opener, and releases Beth and Jay. While a hysterical Daniel breaks down sobbing, Beth and Jay embrace, not noticing Darius's eyes open.

Cast 

 Rob Arbogast as Darius Foxx
 Collene Taylor as Beth Everson
 Bryan W. Lukasik as Daniel Everson/William Foxx
 Jesse Merrill as Jay
 Gil Zuniga as Jack Everson
 Mari Levitan as Beverly Everson
 Jamielyn Kane as Veronica
 Gordon Anthony Davis as Mayor Eastman
 Diana Kauffman as Lisa
 Danielle Petty as Ms. Sinclair
 Sally Robbins as Ms. Pickard
 Dan Harper as Meter Man
 James Thomas as Vince Eastman
 Trumayne Bolden as Vance Eastman
 Jennifer Snow as Mindy
 Dawn Shindle as Wendy
 Blu Fox as Messenger

Reception 

Dread Central's Mike Phalin gave the film a 1½ out of 5, and wrote, "The Mailman just never gets to any sort of peak or level that draws in the viewer" and "With so much potential to be a deep thriller about family ties and morals, it is hard to believe The Mailman ends up being just another one of those cheap films that goes nowhere and does nothing". A 2/5 was awarded by Richard Scheib of Moria, who noted that while The Mailman was bogged down by its low-budget, sub-par cinematography, and melodramatic direction, it was still "a wonderfully sordid little film" with memorable performances by Bryan W. Lukasik, Ari Tinnen, and Rob Arbogast.

See also 

 The Paperboy, a similar film from 1994.

References

External links 
 

2004 films
2004 independent films
2004 LGBT-related films
2004 thriller films
2000s serial killer films
2000s teen films
Adultery in films
American independent films
American serial killer films
American sexploitation films
American teen LGBT-related films
American thriller films
Films about adoption
Films about contract killing
Films about drugs
Films about orphans
Films about siblings
Films about the United States Postal Service
Films set in 1986
Films set in 2004
Films set in California
Films shot in Los Angeles
Films shot in Washington (state)
Lesbian-related films
LGBT-related thriller films
Teen thriller films
Uxoricide in fiction
2000s English-language films
2000s American films